Kharitonovskaya is a rural locality (a village) in Morozovskoye Rural Settlement, Verkhovazhsky District, Vologda Oblast, Russia. The population was 48 as of 2002.

Geography 
The distance to Verkhovazhye is 33.3 km, to Morozovo is 9 km. Kalitinskaya, Silinskaya-2, Bushnitskaya, Ostrovskaya are the nearest rural localities.

References 

Rural localities in Verkhovazhsky District